Ciante Evans (born October 14, 1992) is a Canadian football defensive back for the Montreal Alouettes of the Canadian Football League (CFL). He previously played for the Calgary Stampeders and Montreal Alouettes. He played college football for the Nebraska Cornhuskers.

Professional career
After going undrafted in the 2014 NFL Draft Evans attended the Chicago Bears’ rookie mini-camp in 2014, but wasn’t offered a contract.

Calgary Stampeders 
Evans signed with the Calgary Stampeders of the Canadian Football League (CFL) in time for the 2015 season. He only appeared in three games during his rookie season. Evans established himself as a starter in 2016 and continued to start for the Stampeders through to the 2018 season which culminated in his first Grey Cup championship. In the 106th Grey Cup game, he had one interception in the victory over the Ottawa Redblacks. He became a free agent on February 12, 2019.

Montreal Alouettes 
On May 22, 2019, Evans signed with the Montreal Alouettes. He played in 13 regular season games where he had 29 defensive tackles and three interceptions. He did not play in 2020 due to the cancellation of the 2020 CFL season.

Hamilton Tiger-Cats 
Evans signed with the Hamilton Tiger-Cats on February 9, 2021. In his first season in Hamilton, he contributed with 43 defensive tackles in 13 regular season games. On May 10, 2022, Evans and the Tiger-Cats agreed to a new contract for the 2022 season. He played in 13 regular season games where he had 26 defensive tackles and one interception. He became a free agent upon the expiry of his contract on February 14, 2023.

Montreal Alouettes (II) 
On February 17, 2023, it was announced that Evans had signed a one-year contract with the Montreal Alouettes.

External links 
 Montreal Alouettes bio
 Nebraska Cornhuskers bio

References

1992 births
Living people
American football defensive backs
Canadian football defensive backs
Nebraska Cornhuskers football players
Calgary Stampeders players
Montreal Alouettes players
Hamilton Tiger-Cats players
Sportspeople from Fort Worth, Texas